Joventut Mariana de Sóller Club de Bàsquet, a.k.a. Sóller Bon Día! for sponsorship reasons, is a Spanish basketball club from Sóller, Majorca founded in 1942.

It is best known for its women's team, which played in the LFB between 2008 and 2012. Through these seasons in top-flight Joventut Mariana was a mid-table team, ranging between the 6th and 9th positions. In the 2012 LFB it ranked 8th with a 12–14 record. However, the season was marked by financial strain and on 19 June 2012 the club renounced to its spot in the LFB and retired from competition.

Season by season

References

External links
Official website

Women's basketball teams in Spain
Basketball teams established in 1942
Sport in Mallorca
Sóller
Basketball teams in the Balearic Islands